Shaykh Muhammad Sa‘id al-Jamal ar-Rifa‘i ash-Shadhuli (1935, Tulkarm – 11 November 2015, San Francisco) better known as Shaykh Muhammad al-Jamal, was a Palestinian Islamic scholar, Khatib, Imam of Al-Aqsa Mosque, and famous Sufi scholar of the 21st century. He was a teacher at the Al-Aqsa Mosque and Dome of the Rock in Jerusalem. Muhammad Said al-Jamal was a descendant of Ahmad al-Rifaʽi, founder of Rifaʽi Sufi Order.

Early life
Muhammad Sa‘id al-Jamal ar-Rifa‘i ash-Shadhuli was born in 1935 in Tulkarm city in the Holy Land.

Works
Muhammad Said al-Jamal ar-Rifa'i has written more than 40 books in English and Arabic. His books include:

 Music of the Soul: Sufi Teachings, August 1996.

Death
Muhammad Said al-Jamal ar-Rifa'i died on 11 November 2015 in San Francisco, he was buried in Jerusalem after Salat al-Janazah for him in Al-Aqsa Mosque.

External links
 In Remembrance of Shaykh Muhammad Said Al-Jamal

References

1935 births
2015 deaths
Palestinian Sunni Muslim scholars of Islam
Death in San Francisco
People from Tulkarm
Palestinian writers
Palestinian Sufis
Palestinian scholars